The Compagnie du Sénégal (French for the "Senegal Company" or, more literally, the "Company of the Senegal") was a 17th-century French chartered company that administered the territories of Saint-Louis and Gorée island as part of French Senegal.

First company
The company succeeded to some of the territories of the French West India Company in 1672, just prior to its bankruptcy and the revocation of its charter in 1674. Sieur de Richemont served as governor of its territories from 1672 to 1673 and was succeeded by the company's director Jacques Fuméchon, who served until 1682.

Second company
In 1696, the Compagnie royale du Sénégal was established and operated by Jean Bourguignon from March 1696 to April 1697 and then by  until May 1702. They traded slaves with the Hausa Kingdoms, Mali, and the Moors in Mauritania.

Third company
In 1709, a third Compagnie du Sénégal was established.

See also
 Compagnie du Sénégal et de la Côte occidentale d'Afrique
 List of colonial governors of Senegal
 European chartered companies founded around the 17th century (in French)

Chartered companies
French colonisation in Africa
History of Senegal
African slave traders